Janepher Mbabazi Kyomuhendo ( born: 24-Dec-1979) is a Ugandan accountant by profession who also served as the District Woman Representative for Kagadi District in the 10th parliament of Uganda. She was affiliated with the National Resistance Movement (NRM). She was also re-elected as the District Woman Representative for Kagadi District in the 11th parliament of Uganda.

Background and education 
Janepher Mbabazi Kyomuhendo attended Nyakayojo Secondary School for her Ordinary level education and she got her Uganda Certificate of Education in 1996. She complete her Uganda Advanced Certificate of Education from Kinoni Girls School in 1998. She later went for her further studies at Nkumba University from where she was awarded a Bachelor of Business Administration in 2004. She then went for her Master of Business Administration at Nkumba University and she finished it in 2009.

Work experience 
Janepher Mbabazi Kyomuhendo worked as a Business Manager for AIM Engineering (U) Ltd from 2005 to 2007. She was an Internal Auditor for Mengo Hospital from 2007 to 2009. She became a Finance and Administration Manager for AIM Engineering (U) Ltd from 2009 to 2012. In ILISO Consulting (Pty) Ltd, she was the Finance and Administration Manager from 2012 to 2015. She became a woman Representative Member of Parliament for Kagadi District in the 10th Parliament of Uganda from 2016 to 2021.

She is a member of the Committee of Public Accounts (Commissions, Statutory Authorities and State Enterprises-COSASE) Committee and also she was appointed to be a member of Physical Infrastructure committee.

Other contributions 
Gave Out Saucepans and Money To SACCOS, Funded Football and Netball Tournaments, Pay Fees For 20 Students A Vocation Institution, Donated Saucepans, Hoes, and Plates at The LC1 Office for Community Functions, Gives Scholarships to Outstanding performance Students.

See also 

 List of members of the eleventh Parliament of Uganda
 National Resistance Movement
 Kagadi District

References 

Members of the Parliament of Uganda
1979 births
Ugandan accountants
National Resistance Movement politicians
Kagadi District
Nkumba University alumni
Living people
Women members of the Parliament of Uganda
21st-century Ugandan businesswomen
21st-century Ugandan businesspeople